Maia Giselle Jackman  (born 25 May 1975) is an association football player who represented New Zealand at international level.

Jackman made her full Football Ferns debut in a 0–0 draw with Canada on 6 August 1993, and represented New Zealand at the 2007 FIFA Women's World Cup finals in China, where they lost to Brazil 0–5, Denmark (0–2) and China (0–2).

In the 2013 New Year Honours, Jackman was appointed a Member of the New Zealand Order of Merit for services to football.

References

External links

1975 births
Living people
New Zealand women's international footballers
New Zealand women's association footballers
Members of the New Zealand Order of Merit
Women's association football defenders
2007 FIFA Women's World Cup players